Kream (stylised as KREAM) is a Norwegian DJ and record producer duo consisting of brothers Daniel and Markus Slettebakken, from Bergen.

Career

2016 - 2019 
In 2017 KREAM signed with Atlantic Records /  Big Beat Records  and released the song "Taped Up Heart" which features vocals from Clara Mae. The song  charted on Billboard 's Hot/Dance Electronic Songs chart and peaked at 22. The record has as of 2020 been played 100 million times on Spotify.

On 21 September 2018, KREAM released the song "Decisions" featuring Maia Wright. The song reached number 39 on the Billboard Dance Chart.

2020 – present 
In response to the Covid-19 pandemic of 2020 KREAM started the livestream project "LIQUID : LAB". The shows are recorded at spectacular locations around Norway, showcasing modern architecture and beautiful scenery.

In December 2020, KREAM became the first Norwegian act to reach the number one spot on 1001Tracklist.com with their single "About You"

On 9 December 2022, KREAM released their first EP titled "Reverie", featuring the previously released singles "Rendezvous" and "Chemistry".

Discography 

 Singles and EPs 

 Remixes

Gallery

References

Norwegian record producers
Norwegian electronic music groups
Norwegian DJs
Remixers
Tropical house musicians
Living people
Electronic dance music DJs
Year of birth missing (living people)
Norwegian musical duos
Electronic music duos
Sibling musical duos